Østerås is the terminal station on the Røa Line of the Oslo Metro. The station is located in Bærum municipality, 10.2 km from Stortinget and was opened on 16 November 1972, extending the line from Lijordet.

Østerås is a largely residential area. Next to the station is the middle school Østerås. The station also serves Eikeli Upper Secondary School.

References

External links

Oslo Metro stations in Bærum
Railway stations opened in 1972
1972 establishments in Norway